Facundo Emmanuel Melivilo (born 12 August 1992) is an Argentine professional footballer who plays as a left winger for Güemes.

Career
Melivillo's senior career started in 2009 with Platense in Primera B Nacional, with his debut coming on 28 November in a goalless draw at home to Aldosivi. After seventeen more appearances during 2009–10, which included his first goal in March 2010 vs. Unión Santa Fe, Melivillo was loaned out to Almirante Brown following Platense's relegation to Primera B Metropolitana. He remained with the club for two seasons, 2010–11 and 2011–12, and in total made thirty-five appearances whilst scoring three goals. He returned to Platense in July 2012 and went onto make sixty-seven more appearances and scored six more.

On 14 July 2014, Melivillo completed a move to fellow third tier team Chacarita Juniors. He would score eight goals in twenty games in his first season which ended with promotion to Primera B Nacional. In January 2015, Lanús signed Melivillo on loan. He departed months later after just one appearance; vs. San Lorenzo in the Argentine Primera División on 28 March. Chacarita won promotion from Primera B Nacional to the Primera División during 2016–17, a season that Melivillo spent out on loan with Flandria. For Flandria, he scored five in forty-two matches with his first goal coming vs. Chacarita in 2016.

Defensa y Justicia of the Primera División became Melivillo's sixth professional club in August 2017, he joined on loan until the end of the 2017–18 season. After only three matches for Defensa y Justicia, he returned to Chacarita in December 2017 and was subsequently loaned out to Ecuadorian Serie A side Deportivo Cuenca. He made his debut on 13 February in a Copa Sudamericana defeat to Sportivo Luqueño. He scored his first goal for Deportivo Cuenca on 10 March, during a 4–1 loss away to Emelec. Melivillo departed Chacarita Juniors in June 2018 to Central Córdoba.

He scored two goals in twenty-one games for Central Córdoba, as well as one in three in the play-offs as they won promotion to the Primera División. On 3 July, the left winger renewed his contract with the club. In January 2020, Melivillo agreed a move to second tier Tigre. After, he signed for San Martín de Tucumán and played only four matches on second half 2020. Later, he joined Azerbaijani club Zira FK for the second half of the 2020–21 season. On 22 June 2021, Zira confirmed that Melivilo had left the club.

Career statistics
.

References

External links

1992 births
Living people
Sportspeople from Buenos Aires Province
Argentine footballers
Association football forwards
Argentine expatriate footballers
Primera Nacional players
Primera B Metropolitana players
Argentine Primera División players
Ecuadorian Serie A players
Club Atlético Platense footballers
Club Almirante Brown footballers
Chacarita Juniors footballers
Club Atlético Lanús footballers
Flandria footballers
Defensa y Justicia footballers
C.D. Cuenca footballers
Central Córdoba de Santiago del Estero footballers
Club Atlético Tigre footballers
San Martín de Tucumán footballers
Zira FK players
Club Atlético Güemes footballers
Argentine expatriate sportspeople in Azerbaijan
Argentine expatriate sportspeople in Ecuador
Expatriate footballers in Ecuador
Expatriate footballers in Azerbaijan